This article details the qualifying phase for canoeing at the 2024 Summer Olympics.  Similar to the previous editions, the International Olympic Committee and the International Canoe Federation (ICF) have established a qualification system for both slalom and sprint canoeing. The quota places have already been set for each event by ICF in October 2022.

Qualification summary

Slalom

For the slalom events, the men and women will each compete in C-1, K-1, and the inaugural KX-1 (kayak cross). Quota places are allocated to NOCs, not to specific canoeists. NOCs are limited to one boat for each event. These qualification spots will be awarded as follows:
 World Championships (for canoe and kayak singles) – The highest-ranked eligible canoeists in every single boat (considering only one boat per NOC) will obtain a quota place for their respective NOC. Fifteen qualification spots are available in the K-1 events and twelve in the C-1.
 Global Qualification Tournament (for kayak cross) – The top three eligible NOCs in each kayak cross event will be awarded a quota place.
 Continental Qualification Events – NOCs eligible for qualification in a given event will secure a single quota place for their respective continent.
 Host country – As the host country, France reserves one quota place each for the men's and women's slalom canoe and kayak singles. If one or more French slalom canoeists qualify regularly and directly, their slots will be reallocated to the next highest-ranked eligible NOCs in the kayak singles from the 2023 ICF World Championships, or any of the continental qualification tournaments.
 Universality places – Two invitational places will be entitled to eligible NOCs interested to have their canoeists (whether slalom or sprint) compete in Paris 2024 as granted by the Universality principle.
 Reallocation – Unused quota spots will be reallocated.

Timeline

Qualification table

Italic: National federation has qualified a boat but the athlete who previously accomplished this feat is already counted in another boat.
* No continental qualifying race is held as fewer than three nations are eligible.
** National federation is limited to two athlete quota places at a continental qualifying event.

Sprint

NOCs are limited to two boats per sprint event, a maximum of six per gender in kayaking, and a maximum of three per gender in canoeing, constituting a roster of eighteen canoeists. The qualification pathway enables the NOC to participate and not necessarily those who earn a direct quota place. These qualification spots will be awarded as follows:
 World Championships – The highest-ranked eligible canoeists in every single boat (considering only one boat per NOC) will obtain a quota place for their respective NOC. Five-boat spots are available in the C-1 events with an additional place reserved for the host country each in the men's 1000 m and women's 200 m, seven in the K-1 events (including a berth reserved for the host country in the men's 1000 m and women's 500 m), six in the K-2 500 m, eight in the C-2 500 m, and ten in the K-4 500 m.
 Continental Qualification Events – NOCs eligible for qualification in a given event will secure an assigned number of quota places for their respective continent. For the K-1 and C-1 events, two-boat spots will be awarded for each continent, except for Africa and Oceania (both of which will earn a single quota place). For the K-2 and C-2 events, a single-boat berth is assigned to each continent based on the results from the World Championships: the highest-ranked NOCs eligible for qualification across five different continents will secure a direct quota place.
 Host country – As the host country, France reserves one quota place for the events listed in the World Championships section. If one or more French slalom canoeists qualify regularly and directly, their slots will be reallocated to the next highest-ranked eligible NOCs in the corresponding event from the 2023 ICF World Championships.
 Universality places – Two invitational places will be entitled to eligible NOCs interested to have their canoeists (whether slalom or sprint) compete in Paris 2024 as granted by the Universality principle.
 Reallocation – Unused quota spots will be reallocated. Practically, several canoeists from their respective NOCs qualified for a larger boat category may also compete in a smaller category, sparing the athlete quota place that the NOC has earned in a smaller category.

Timeline

Qualification table

References

Qualification
Qualification for the 2024 Summer Olympics
Olympics qualification
Olympics qualification